KKSM is a 500-Watt Class B college radio station broadcasting full-time at 1320 kHz from the campus of Palomar College, San Marcos, California.  The station, licensed in Oceanside, simulcasts via Cox Cable channel 957 and streams via the internet.

Organization
Students in the Palomar College radio broadcasting program make up the station on-air staff. Radio students also serve as the station's Program Director, Music Director, Promotions Director, Sports Director, News Director, Public Service Announcement Director. A faculty advisor serves in the position of General Manager and an independent contractor serves as the Chief Engineer.

Format
Format emphasis is on alternative music with specialty and freeform (radio format) programs encompassing other musical genres. The station also has talk shows devoted to sports, professional wrestling, and nerdcore.  Local sports programming covers Palomar College football and selected high school games in the North County area.

The station also showcases local music on several shows and within the station's format. Artists perform regularly on KKSM on a variety of shows. Artists that have performed or appeared on KKSM include Tribal Seeds, Ike Turner, Jason Mraz, Korn, Thee Corsairs, Candye Kane, Tristan Prettyman, and others.

Guests that have been interviewed on KKSM include Lou Dobbs, former New Mexico Governor Gary Johnson, former Congressman Duke Cunningham, U.S. Rep. Darrell Issa, Frankie Laine, Jay Leno, Caspar Weinberger, Art Linkletter, Sally Ride, Red Buttons, director Jim Sheridan, Angelyne, Graham Nash, adult film star Mary Carey, Johnny Knoxville, George Carlin, author Max Brooks, Shawn Wayans, The Smothers Brothers, Frank Gorshin, Marty Allen, Lisa Moretti (aka Ivory), Elmo Shropshire, Mitch Miller, Luke Ski, The Bran Flakes, UFC's Joey Beltran and others.

History
KKSM was founded in 1976 (as KSM) and started in a closet in the former drama lab of Palomar College. From 1979 until 1996, the station was only available via Cox cable radio. With the Telecommunications Act of 1996, local radio corporation PAR Broadcasting donated the 1320 AM signal to Palomar College.

Famous alumni of KKSM include Fox Sports announcer Jeanne Zelasko, Network TV voice Erik Thompson, TV Anchor John Gregory, longtime San Diego radio announcers AJ Machado, Meg Banta, Greg Simms, Jenn Aquino, Boy Toy Jesse along with KPBS's Alison St. John and Kenny Goldberg, adult film star and Playboy Radio host Kylie Ireland, nerdcore rapper Zealous1 and internet personality Bob Stencil.

Coverage
Coverage is along a crescent-shaped area stretching in a north–south direction from San Juan Capistrano to La Jolla and in an east–west direction from Interstate 15 to the coast. The 500-watt tower was designed to be heard in boats offshore.

Accolades 
In 2013, the station won the Golden Microphone award from the Intercollegiate Broadcasting System for Best Community College Station. In 2015, the College Media Association presented awards for "Radio Station of the Year" and "Best Newscast" to KKSM. College Broadcasters Inc. also presented an award for Best Entertainment Program to a member of the staff.

References

External links
 Official Website
 KKSM at palomar.edu 
 KKSM on Facebook

 

KSM
KSM
Oceanside, California